Amazones Dramas A.S. is a Greek women's football club from the city of Drama. It plays in Greek's highest national football league, the Greek A Division known as Alpha Ethniki. The team won the championship in 2013–14, ending an eight-year title run by PAOK.

History
The club was founded in September 2005.
In 2010/11 the team played its first season in the top division finishing 10th out of 13.

Honours
Greek A Division champions: 2014
Greek Women's Cup runners-up: 2014

References

External links
Official website
Amazones Dramas on Facebook
 Amazones Dramas Profile in UEFA

Association football clubs established in 2005
Women's football clubs in Greece
2005 establishments in Greece